Vincent DiFrancesca (January 1, 1922 – May 21, 2007) was an American football player and coach. He served as the head football coach at Western Illinois University from 1949 to 1953, at Iowa State University from 1954 to 1956, and at Carroll College—now known as Carroll University—in Waukesha, Wisconsin from 1959 to 1971, compiling a career college football coaching record of 106–71–7.

Playing career
DiFrancesca was drafted by the Pittsburgh Steelers in the 31st round of the 1947 NFL draft.

Coaching career

Western Illinois
DiFrancesca was the head football coach at Western Illinois Leathernecks in Macomb, Illinois and he held that position for five seasons, from 1949 until 1953. His career coaching record at Western Illinois was 38–7–1. Under DiFrancesca's leadership, Western's team was ranked among the best offensive and defensive teams in the nation for five years.

Iowa State
DiFrancesca was also the head coach at Iowa State University from 1954 to 1956. He was the 21st head coach for the Cyclones. His coaching record at Iowa State was 6–21–1.

Carroll
DiFrancesca's final head coaching job was as the 22nd head football coach at Carroll College in Waukesha, Wisconsin and he held that position for 13 seasons, from 1959 until 1971. His record at Carroll was 62–43–5.

DiFrancesca also served as athletic director while he was head football coach. He was inducted into the Carroll College Athletic Hall of Fame in 1994.

Personal life
DiFrancesca died in May 2007 and was the father of both national radio talkshow host Janet Parshall of Janet Parshall's America and the late Charlie DiFrancesca, the subject of the book "Charlie Di: The Story of The Legendary Bond Trader", by William D. Fallon.
And, his youngest son John Di Francesca. DiFrancesca also had a wife Margret, who was a proud Icelandic, Baptist, Republican who converted Vince to her beliefs. The Di Francesca family came from Italy, lived in Evanston, Illinois on Ashland Ave. Raised Roman Catholic, mother Elizabeth Farina Di Francesca and father Salvatore, "Sam". Vince had two older brothers, Pete and Sam. All are deceased now.

Head coaching record

References

1922 births
2007 deaths
American football guards
Carroll Pioneers athletic directors
Carroll Pioneers football coaches
Iowa State Cyclones football coaches
Northwestern Wildcats football players
Western Illinois Leathernecks football coaches
People from Melrose Park, Illinois
Sportspeople from Cook County, Illinois